NA-80 Mandi Bahauddin-II is a constituency for the National Assembly of Pakistan.

Members of Parliament

2018-2022: NA-86 Mandi Bahauddin-II

Election 2002 

General elections were held on 10 Oct, 2002. Major(R) Zulfiqar Ali Gondal of PPP won by securing 71,424 votes.

Election 2008 

General elections were held on 18 Feb 2008. Nazar Muhammad Gondal of PPP won by 74,163 votes.

Election 2013 

General elections were held on 11 May 2013. Nasir Iqbal Bosal from Pakistan Muslim League (N) won by scoring 1,33,128 votes. Nazar Muhammad Gondal of Pakistan Peoples Party was runner-up who secured 43,574 votes.

Election 2018 
General elections were held on 25 July 2018. Nasir Iqbal Bosal won the seat.

See also
NA-79 Mandi Bahauddin-I
NA-81 Hafizabad

References

External links 
 Election result's official website

NA-109